Makoto Imaoka (今岡 誠, born September 11, 1974), nicknamed "Makochan", is a former Japanese professional baseball player from Takarazuka, Hyōgo, Japan.

Career
Imaoka spent several uneventful seasons in the Japanese professional leagues before being chosen as the leadoff batter by Senichi Hoshino, who managed the Hanshin Tigers from 2002 to 2004. Imaoka won the batting title in 2003 with a .340 batting average, and his team won the Central League pennant the same year. He had previously played shortstop and second base, but was converted to third base in 2004. He continued his hitting prowess, and led the league with 147 RBIs in 2005. He fell into a huge slump in 2006, and missed half of the season due to injuries.

He won a silver medal playing for the Japanese national team in the 1996 Summer Olympics before entering the Japanese professional leagues.

Career statistics (through 2011)

References

External links

1974 births
Living people
Chiba Lotte Marines players
Baseball players at the 1996 Summer Olympics
Hanshin Tigers players
Japanese baseball coaches
Nippon Professional Baseball coaches
Nippon Professional Baseball infielders
Olympic baseball players of Japan
Olympic medalists in baseball
Olympic silver medalists for Japan
People from Takarazuka, Hyōgo
Baseball people from Hyōgo Prefecture
Toyo University alumni
Medalists at the 1996 Summer Olympics